The following lists events that happened during 1943 in South Africa.

Incumbents
 Monarch: King George VI.
 Governor-General: Sir Patrick Duncan (until 17 July), Nicolaas Jacobus de Wet (acting starting 17 July).
 Prime Minister: Jan Christiaan Smuts.
 Chief Justice: Nicolaas Jacobus de Wet then Ernest Frederick Watermeyer.

Events
 27 January – Prime Minister of South Africa Jan Smuts asks parliament for approval to send troops into Europe.
 13 May – German Afrika Korps and Italian troops in North Africa surrender to Allied forces.
 18 July – Nicolaas Jacobus de Wet is appointed Officer Administering the Government, i.e. acting Governor-General of the Union of South Africa.

Unknown date
 Reclamation work begins on the Foreshore in Cape Town.
 500 Polish orphans arrive in Oudtshoorn from the Soviet Union.

Births
 5 March – Mmakgabo Helen Sebidi, artist
 30 May – Ken Andrew, politician
 1 June – Lorrie Wilmot, cricketer (d. 2004)
 30 August – John Kani, actor & playwright

Deaths
 6 July – Alexander Coultate Rabagliati, fighter pilot, is reported missing in action.
 17 July – Sir Patrick Duncan, 6th Governor-General of the Union of South Africa. (b. 1870)

Railways

Railway lines opened
 29 January – Transvaal: New Canada to Phomolong, .
 7 June – Transvaal: Hercules to Koedoespoort, .

Sports
1942–43 South African cricket season

References

History of South Africa